Inline skating is a multi-disciplinary sport and can refer to a number of activities practiced using inline skates. Inline skates typically have two to five polyurethane wheels depending on the style of practice, arranged in a single line by a metal or plastic frame on the underside of a boot. The in-line design allows for greater speed and maneuverability than traditional (or "quad") roller skates. Following this basic design principle, inline skates can be modified to varying degrees to accommodate niche disciplines.

Inline skating is commonly referred to by the proprietary eponym rollerblading, or just blading, due to the popular brand of inline skates, Rollerblade.

History

An inline skate appeared in a Paris patent in 1819, but were overtaken in popularity by quad skates.

The German branch of SKF developed and produced inline-skates in 1978 with wheels for hockey or for the street. The product was stopped after one year as the management did not want a consumer product in its portfolio.

Other inline skates were developed as a substitute for ice skates, Life magazine published a photo of American skater Eric Heiden, training for the 1980 Olympics, using such skates on a Wisconsin road.

In 1980, a group of ice hockey players in Minneapolis, Minnesota, were looking for a way to practice during the summer. Scott and Brennan Olson formed the company Rollerblade, Inc., to sell skates with four polyurethane wheels arranged in a straight line on the bottom of a padded boot. They sold the company in 1984 to Bob Naegele jr., who advertised to the general public and sold millions.

The sport became popular in the United States in the 1980s and 1990s, with tens of millions of participants. Aggressive inline skating events were featured in the X Games from 1995 to 2005. Popularity waned in the 2000s, with parental concerns over injuries and the rising popularity of soccer, lacrosse, and skateboarding. There was a revival sparked by the need for socially distanced recreation during the COVID-19 pandemic.

Due to the 2022 Russian invasion of Ukraine, World Skate banned Russian and Belarusian athletes and officials from its competitions, and will not stage any events in Russia or Belarus in 2022.

Disciplines

Aggressive inline
 
Aggressive skating (referred to by participants as rollerblading, blading, skating or rolling) is a sub-discipline primarily focused on the execution of tricks in the action sports canon. Aggressive inline skates are specially modified to accommodate grinds and the jumping of large gaps. Aggressive skates are identifiable by a prominent gap in between the second and third wheels (known as the H-Block) which allows for grinds perpendicular to the direction of the wheels. A hard plastic surface on the sole of the boot known as a "sole plate" or "soul plate" allows for grinds parallel to the wheels. From these grind surfaces comes a lexicon of well-known grind stances, though sliding can occur on any surface of the boot or wheels. Aggressive skates typically have much smaller wheels than regular inline skates. The small size allows for more freedom when grinding as there is less risk of catching on obstacles. These smaller wheels feature a flat profile to accommodate the impact from jumping tall heights.

Alpine skating
Alpine skating on roller skis owes its existence to skiing, enabling skiers to train in the off-season despite a lack of snow. Skaters complete a course marked by gates while descending at high speeds. Its basic movements are therefore similar to those of downhill skiing and many athletes regularly practice both modalities.

Artistic/figure skating

Artistic roller skaters use either quad or inline skates. The sport looks very similar to its counterpart on ice, but more affordable in warmer climates. Inline figure skating has been included in the world championships since 2002.

Fitness/recreational skating
Recreational skaters usually skate on roads, bike lanes, or paved trails.  They might be skating solo for transportation or fitness, skating with friends, or participating in an organized event.  Because urban areas tend to have more hazards from traffic, many cities have organized social groups to make skating safer.

Fitness skaters tend to skate more frequently and go longer distances. Fitness skates typically have faster bearings and larger wheels to generate speed and cover ground more efficiently. Skaters in this category tend to skate  on average.

Freestyle skating

Freestyle skating is a form of inline skating performed on flat ground and refers collectively to the disciplines for which competitions are organized by the International Freestyle Skaters Association. Currently IFSA has defined three disciplines which must be offered by any competition they sanction: freestyle slalom, speed slalom, and free jump. Two additional disciplines, high jump and jam, are also defined, but are at present considered optional.

Hockey

Roller in-line hockey is performed in a special rink on inline skates and was originally thought up by ice hockey players who wanted to continue training in their off season. Hockey rollerblades have wheel sizes generally in the 72–80mm range. The toe end of the boot is characteristically squared off. The feel of the boot is generally the same as ice skates, so the switch off between hockey skates and hockey is diminished, leading to better in-training simulations of ice hockey.

Off-road skating

Roller soccer

Five-a-side football on skates taking place in an indoor sports hall or outside space with appropriate demarcation.

Speed skating 
Also known as inline racing, speed skating is the sport of skating (usually on flat surfaces, such as roller rinks) with the intent to beat the opponent's time score or get to the finish line first.

Vert skating

Vert skating is a form of gymnastics performed with skates. The purpose of vert skating is to ride higher than the coping (which is the metal pipe on top of the ramp) and perform spins or flips. It focuses on complicated hard aerial maneuvers, such as spins and flips. The intent of the skater is to build speed until they are of sufficient height above the edge of the ramp to perform various aerial acrobatics. In competitions skaters have limited time, often less than a minute, to impress the judges by landing numerous and difficult tricks. Vert skating may occur in competition and was once part of the X Games. Vert ramps are also present in many skateparks.

References

External links

 
Roller sports